The 2005–06 Moldovan "A" Division season is the 15th since its establishment. A total of 16 teams are contesting the league.

League table

References

External links
 Moldova. Second Level 2005/06 - RSSSF
 "A" Division - moldova.sports.md

Moldovan Liga 1 seasons
2
Moldova